Aretas Brooks Fleming (October 15, 1839October 13, 1923) was the 8th governor of West Virginia. In 1865, he married Carrie Watson. When he ran as the Democratic nominee in the election of 1888, the election was disputed by the Legislature. In 1890, the Legislature agreed that Fleming had defeated Nathan Goff, Jr. Both Fleming and Goff were sworn in as governor on March 4, 1889.

The Supreme Court of Appeals of West Virginia ruled that outgoing governor Emmanuel Willis Wilson would remain governor; State Senate President Robert S. Carr had claimed authority until the Court reached its decision. In 1890, the Legislature agreed that Fleming had defeated Nathan Goff, Jr. As a result, Fleming did not assume the office until February 6, 1890. He left office in 1893 and continued to practice law, and pursue business interests, specifically in the coal industry. Fleming, along with his brother-in-law Clarence W. Watson, formed many coal companies, and sought to remove their competitors.
 
Fleming died on October 13, 1923 in Fairmont, West Virginia. He is interred at Woodlawn Cemetery. A large obelisk marks his grave.

See also
List of governors of West Virginia

References

West Virginia Archives & History

External links
Biography of Aretas B. Fleming
Inaugural Address of Aretas B. Fleming
The West Virginia & Regional History Center at West Virginia University houses the papers of Aretas B. Fleming within A&M 40 and A&M 568

Politicians from Fairmont, West Virginia
Democratic Party governors of West Virginia
1839 births
1923 deaths
Burials at Woodlawn Cemetery (Fairmont, West Virginia)
19th-century American politicians
Governors of West Virginia